Colonel Ian Simon Fraser is a leading producer of large-scale military tattoos and events in Canada and overseas.

Biography 
Born in 1932, Fraser served in the Canadian Army and Canadian Forces from 1952 to 1983, retiring with the rank of colonel, having had regimental service with The Black Watch (Royal Highland Regiment) of Canada, The Royal Canadian Regiment (RCR) and the Canadian Airborne Regiment. Fraser was commanding officer of 2RCR, the Canadian School of Infantry and the Canadian Airborne Regiment, and during his military career served in Canada, Germany, India and Cyprus. Fraser is also a graduate of the Indian Defence Services Staff College and the Canadian National Defence College.

After producing a small scale Tattoo in the late 1950s, in 1962 Fraser was recruited as the Producer/Director of the Canadian Tattoo for the Seattle World's Fair. In 1967 he was then chosen to write, produce and direct the Canadian Armed Forces Centennial Tattoo 1967. The Centennial Tattoo remains the world's largest ever touring production, touring across Canada from April to November 1967, and presented in 44 locations covering every Canadian province.

In 1979, Fraser produced and directed the first Nova Scotia Tattoo, to mark the first International Gathering of the Clans outside Scotland. The event was attended and opened by Queen Elizabeth The Queen Mother. The Nova Scotia Tattoo has since been held annually, becoming known as the Royal Nova Scotia International Tattoo, following the royal designation bestowed upon the event in 2006 by Queen Elizabeth II on the occasion of the 80th birthday.

Fraser remained producer/director until 2007, when he passed the role of producer on to CEO Ann Montague. Fraser remained artistic director of the show, until taking a consulting role then retiring from the production in 2016.

In addition to his work in Nova Scotia, Fraser has acted as a consultant for a variety of additional productions in Canada, Australia, South Africa, the United States and Europe, producing and directing over 1000 shows throughout his career. Fraser has also written plays for the Canadian Broadcasting Company (CBC), authored a number of books, and been the recipient of numerous awards including the Order of Military Merit, the Canadian Forces Decoration and the Order of Nova Scotia. In 2001 Fraser was granted a Doctor of Civil Laws, Honoris Causa, from Acadia University.

See also
 Military Tattoo

References

Seattle Times, 22 September 1964

Ottawa Citizen, 25 August 1965

The Brandon Sun, 1 September 1965

Wainwright Star Chronicle,  1 September 1965

The Atlantic Advocate, October 1965

Weekend Magazine #36, 1966

The Sentinel Magazine, May 1966

Montreal Star, 20 June 1966

Toronto Daily Star, 30 July 1966

Pictou Gazette February 1976

Globe and Mail, 25 March 1967

Toronto Telegram, 25 March 1967

The Yukon News, 4 April 1967

Toronto Daily Star, 24 June 1967

Vancouver Life, July 1967

Saint Catherine's Standard, 7 July  1967

Le Droit, 14 August 1967

Ottawa Journal, 17 August 1967

Ottawa Citizen, 18 August 1967

Ottawa Journal, 21 August 1967

The Toronto Daily Star, 29 August 1967

The Toronto Telegram, 29 August 1967

The Toronto Telegram, 30 August 1967

The Toronto Daily Star, 31 August 1967

The Barrie Examiner, 26 August 1967

The Toronto Telegram, 1 September 1967

Ottawa Citizen, 24 August 1969

External links
 Colonel Ian S. Fraser, Biography
 Ian S. Fraser at LinkedIn
 Canadian Armed Forces Tattoo 1967

Canadian Army officers
1932 births
Living people
Officers of the Order of Military Merit (Canada)
Members of the Order of Nova Scotia
Canadian military musicians
Black Watch (Royal Highland Regiment) of Canada officers
Royal Canadian Regiment officers
Canadian Airborne Regiment officers